Little Saturday (Bokmål and , ,) is a European concept especially celebrated in Sweden, Norway, Finland, and Bulgaria that adds Wednesday to the list of "drinking days". Many nightclubs and bars stay open late and offer many kinds of little Saturday specials such as music shows and drink specials.

Variants by country 
Swedish and Norwegian teenagers and young adults often use ,  as a synonym for Wednesday ( in Swedish and Norwegian). In Bulgaria,  or Little Saturday is well known among the youths and the elderly generations as well. In the UK and Ireland, "Little Saturday Wednesdays" offer student discounts in some bars, and the Wednesday as Little Saturday is in some places seen as the students night out, although it is not as widespread as in other countries.

In Sweden and Norway, the tradition comes from 'the maid's Saturday' , which fell on a Wednesday. That was the day when the maid had her day off, as she normally did not have any time off on Saturdays.

"Little Saturday" is also a common term among residents of the Knox Prairie, North Texas Plains, referring to an early weekend break.

"Little Saturday" referring to Wednesday is also a well known concept amongst South Africans, young and old and is used to justify a mid-week tipple when the week seems too long.

In Ithaca, New York, Little Saturdays are referenced to as "group therapy".

In Bulgaria,  or "Little Saturday" is very common for people to go out and drink. The common perception is that a person will get very drunk on Wednesday and use Thursday to go to work to sober up until that same person is sober enough to go out on Friday and get drunk again after work.

References

European culture
Drinking culture